Alianza Petrolera is a Colombian professional football team based in Barrancabermeja, that currently plays in the Categoría Primera A. The club was founded in 1991 and played in the Categoría Primera B until 2012. They play their home games at the Daniel Villa Zapata stadium. They have also played home matches in the town of Guarne, Antioquia and in Floridablanca.

History
Alianza Petrolera was a founding member of Categoría Primera B and played in that league from 1992 to 2012. They enjoyed a significant run of success between 1998 and 2004, finishing as runners-up in 2002. However, their fortunes changed after that and by 2009 the club was on the verge of folding.

In the 2009 Apertura, they performed dismally, earning just five points and not winning a single game. The club was short on sponsors, coaches, and players, and their participation in the Finalizacion seemed doubtful. They managed to compete, but finished dead last. In early 2011, Alianza Petrolera signed a partnership deal with Atlético Nacional that would net them players and coaching staff on loan, with much of the wages covered by the latter team.

This new arrangement revitalized the club, which qualified for the finals of the "Torneo Finalización" in 2012. This earned them a berth in the final against Deportivo Rionegro. Alianza prevailed, winning the first leg 1–0 and the second leg 3–1. That earned them a spot in the season final against América de Cali, with promotion on the line. The first leg ended 2–1 in favor of Alianza, but the second leg ended 1–0 in favor of América de Cali. The series went to penalty kicks, where Alianza Petrolera prevailed and earned promotion to the top flight for the very first time.

Alianza has not been relegated back since. Their best campaign in the top flight was in the 2015 Finalización tournament. During the first stage, the club enjoyed a consistent performance, leading the table for some rounds of the tournament and ending in sixth place with 33 points, which allowed them to qualify for the knockout stages for the first time, losing to Independiente Medellín in the quarterfinals.

Honours
Categoría Primera B: 
Winners (1): 2012
Runners-up (1): 2002

Stadium

Players

First-team squad

Out on loan

Former players

Records

Most capped players
Source: BDFA

Last updated on: 20 May 2016

Top scorers
Source: BDFA

Last updated on: 20 May 2016

Notable players
List of call-ups to national teams:
 Ricardo Jerez, Jr. (2013–14)
 Nelson Barahona (2014)

Managers

Source: Worldfootball.net

References

External links
Alianza Petrolera page on DIMAYOR.com

Football clubs in Colombia
Association football clubs established in 1991
1991 establishments in Colombia
Categoría Primera A clubs
Categoría Primera B clubs
Unrelegated association football clubs
Alianza Petrolera F.C.